JL or Jl may refer to:

Businesses and brands
 JL Audio, a manufacturer of consumer audio products
 Jeep Wrangler (JL) model, beginning production in 2018

People
 JL Skinner (born 2001), American football player
 Justin Langer (born 1970), former Australian cricket player

Places
Jubaland, a Somali regional state south of Koofur Orsi
 Mount Lebanon Governorate (ISO 3166-2:LB code)
 Jilin, a province of China (Guobiao abbreviation JL)

Other uses
 Japan Airlines (IATA airline designator)
 Jaunais laiks, or New Era Party, a Latvian political party
 Justice League, superheroes in DC Comics
 Chinese military technology:
 JL-2 (missile)
 JL-8 (aircraft)
 JL-10A (radar system)
 Joban Line, railway line in Japan